Belyak was a fief or administrative subdivision in Medieval Volga Finnic states.

Etymology
The same as beylik, equivalent of county in other parts of Europe.

Medieval Volga Finnic States

Temnikov Principality and Mordvin Horde were divided into belyaks. After Russian Colonization they transformed into uyezds, modern day raions and aimaks in Mordovia.

See also
Aimak – administrative subdivision in Mordovia
El, ancient Volga Finnic term for  country, state. See Mari El, Udmurt Elkun, Moxel (Mokshaland)

References

Sources

External links

Volga basin
Volga Finns
Volga Tatars
Types of administrative division